Ellen Kooi (born November 7, 1962, in Leeuwarden), is a Dutch artist and photographer, who lives and works in Haarlem, the Netherlands. She is perhaps best known for her scenographic, theatrical imagery merging landscapes and figures–in the tradition of the city's landscape painters from the Dutch Golden Age.

Biography
Kooi graduated from the Academie Minerva, in Groningen, in 1987; she was an artist in residency, and completed post-graduate studies, at the Rijksacademie van Beeldende Kunsten, in Amsterdam, from 1993 to 1994. 
Within her body of work, themes of humans' intimate interactions with their surrounding natural world are explored. From unsettling landscapes, often populated only by young adults; to reassuring scenes of soothing serenity, and shelter; and serendipitous escapes; her subjects–nature and actor–are dramatically staged. Her work has been acquired by the Frans Hals Museum, the Fries Museum, and the Dutch Ministry of Foreign Affairs, all in the Netherlands, as well as the Collection Hermès, in Luxembourg, and the Borusan Contemporary, in Turkey, among others. Her work is additionally housed in numerous private collections.

She is represented by Torch Gallery, in Amsterdam.

Exhibitions

Solo 
2015
 Undertones, at Musée de La Roche-sur-Yon, la Roche-sur-Yon, France
 Docks Art Fair Lyon, Gallerie Les Filles Du Calvaire

2014
 Undertones, solo show at Centro de Arte Alcobendas (CAA), Madrid, Spain
 AIPAD Photography Show (PPOW Gallery), New York
 As it Happens, Galerie Les Filles Du Calvaire, Paris, France

2013
 Sables Mouvants, Lambertart, Le Fort de Mons-en-Baroeul, Lille, France

2012
 Transparent Days, Camara Oscura, Madrid, Spain
 Next to Me, Torch Gallery, Amsterdam, the Netherlands
 Recent Photography, Catharine Clark Gallery, San Francisco, USA
 Luz Holandesa, Espacio Liquido, Gijon, Spain

2011
 Out of Sight, PPOW Gallery, New York City
 Ellen Kooi: Out of Sight, Le Château d’Eau, Toulouse, France
 On the Other Side of Twilight, duo-show with Astrid Kruse Jensen, Stedelijk Museum Den Bosch, the Netherlands

2010
 Out of Sight/Hors de Vue, Institut Néerlandais, Paris, France 
 Ellen Kooi, Photographies, Le centre Image/ Imatge, Orthez, France

2009
 "Borrowed Landscapes", part of Festival Off PhotoEspaña, Gallery Camara Oscura, Madrid, Spain
 Fotowerken, de Willem III, Vlissingen, the Netherlands
 Recent Work, Torch Gallery, Amsterdam, the Netherlands

2008
 "Dentro por Fuera, Within from Without", soloshow, La Casa Encendida, Madrid, Spain
 Recent Photography, Espacio Liquido, Gijon, Spain

2006
 Travaux Recents, duo show with Hans Op De Beeck, Les Filles du Calvaire, Paris, France

2005
 Hold Still, Keep Moving IV, Gallery Beaumontpublic, Luxemburg, Luxemburg

Group 
2015
Common Ground: Air, collections from the Borusan contemporary Art Collection, Borusan Contemporary, Istanbul, Turkey
 Femina ou la reappropriation des models, Pavillon Vendôme, Clichy, France 

2014
 Absurd–Did You Say Absurd?, Galerie Les Filles Du Calvaire, Paris, France
 Aux frontières de l'intime: les photographes et leurs enfants, Musée français de la Photographie, Bièvres, France 

2013
 La metamorfosis del paisaje en el arte, group show, Caja Vital Foundation. Vitoria, Spain

2011
 Opening Exhibition Borusan Contemporary, Perili Köşk, Istanbul, Turkey
 Photo Event, De Garage, Mechelen, Belgium
 Foto = Kunst (the Art of Photography), Museum het Valkhof, Nijmegen, the Netherlands
 The International Festival of Photography of Lodz, main program: OUT OF LIFE, Lodz, Poland

2008
 Times Square, Beaumontpublic, Luxemburg, Luxembourg
 De kleur van Friesland, beeldende kunst na 1945, Fries Museum, the Netherlands

2006
 Trial Balloons, Musac, Museo de Arte Contemporaneo de Castilla Y Leon, Spain
 Photography Biennale MOSCOW, Ruarts Gallery, Moscow house of photography, Moscow, Russia
 Untouchable Things, Museum Centre Vaprikki, Tampere, Finland

2005
  Out There: Landscape in the New Millennium, Museum of Contemporary Art, Cleveland, USA
 Constructed Moment, KW14, Den Bosch, the Netherlands
 Dutch Eyes/Chrysalis, Castello Svevo, Bari, Italy
 HxBxD, Exhibition Collection Rabobank, GEM & Fotomuseum, The Hague, the Netherlands
 Going Dutch, new photography from the Netherlands, Museum of New Art (Mona), Michigan, USA
 Histoire(s)Parallèle(s), création-confrontation, France/Pays-Bas, by E. Kessels (NL) and G.Bauret (F) FOAM, Amsterdam, the Netherlands

2003
 Potential Images of the World, the Speed Art Museum, Louisville, Kentucky, USA
 Retrospective View, Photos from the collection, Frans Hals Museum, Haarlem, the Netherlands

2002
 Faces, People and Society, (contemporary photography) Frans Hals Museum, Haarlem, the Netherlands

References

External links 
 Ellen Kooi
 Torch Gallery

1962 births
Living people
Dutch photographers
Artists from Haarlem